The Nymphe was a 40-gun  of the French Navy, designed by Sané.

Career 
In 1811, Nymphe was assigned to a frigate division under Joseph-François Raoul, along with Méduse, tasked to support Java. On 2 September, the frigates arrived at Surabaya, tailed by the 32-gun frigate HMS Bucephalus. On the 4th, another British ship, joined the chase, but lost contact on the 8th. On the 12th, Méduse and Nymphe chased the Bucephalus, which escaped and broke contact the next day. The squadron was back in Brest on 22 December 1811.

She then served in the Atlantic.

The French burnt all the vessels they captured, except Prince George. They put their prisoners into her and sent her off as a cartel to Barbados, which she reached on 10 January 1815.

Between 1814 and 1824, she was decommissioned in Penfeld, only undertaking a refit in 1822.

From 1832, she was used as a hulk, and was eventually broken up in 1873.

Notes

Citations

References
 
 

Age of Sail frigates of France
Pallas-class frigates (1808)
1810 ships